Bayne is a ghost town in Lincoln County, Kansas, United States.

History
Initially named Ingalls was issued a post office in 1873. The post office was renamed Bayne in 1888 after the Bayne, Russell County, Kansas, post office was discontinued. The Bayne, Lincoln County, post office was discontinued in 1894. l

References

Former populated places in Lincoln County, Kansas
Former populated places in Kansas